Susupe (Old Japanese name: 鈴部町, Suzubu-chō) is a village on Saipan, Northern Mariana Islands. Susupe is also known as Susupi. As of 2000, its population is 2,083.

Judicial capital

Capitol Hill is the seat of government for the Commonwealth but the judicial branch is headquartered at the House of Justice in Susupe. Thus, the CNMI is one of three U.S. jurisdictions whose supreme courts are not located in the state/commonwealth capital proper.  The other two jurisdictions are California, whose seat of government is 
Sacramento but the judicial capital is San Francisco; and Louisiana, whose supreme court remained in New Orleans when the state capital was moved to Baton Rouge.

Education
Commonwealth of the Northern Mariana Islands Public School System, which is headquartered in Susupe, serves the town. Marianas High School is located in Susupe, across the street from the House of Justice.

Joeten-Kiyu Public Library (JKPL) of the State Library of the Commonwealth of the Northern Mariana Islands is in Susupe.

Tourism

Three major hotels serve the Susupe area and its surrounding neighborhoods. (Several little hotels also provide the area with more affordable options.)
 Kanoa Resort Saipan (formerly Grand Hotel)
 Aquarius Beach Tower
 Saipan World Resort (formerly Diamond Hotel)

Lake Susupe

Lake Susupe is the only lake in Saipan and is located in the village of Susupe. It is home to a few species of birds found only in the Marianas. One of the endangered birds, the Mariana common moorhen, has a Saipan population of 30–40. It is unknown what natural trees grew here because they were cleared in the 1930s to make room for sugar cane fields and the native fish died when the tilapia was introduced in the 1960s. Today, large ironwood trees grow and, in some places, very thick  reeds. There are also 17 little ponds around the lake. The ponds and even the lake are home to very large fancy-tail guppies. The lake is often visited by birds from Asia which migrate to Lake Susupe during the winter.

References

Towns and villages in the Northern Mariana Islands
Saipan